The Cité Scolaire Internationale de Lyon (CSI), also known as the Lycée International de Lyon or Lycée de Gerland, is an international school located near the confluence of the Rhône and the Saône in the city of Lyon, France. It provides education combining regular French classes with classes in the second language of the student. The international sections include English, Italian, Spanish, Polish, German, Portuguese, Chinese, Arabic and Japanese. The classes are taught from primary level all the way up to the high school diploma, the Baccalaureat, which is available with the International Option (OIB, or "Option Internationale du Baccalauréat").

There are 1900 students in the school, from primary to high school; over 40 nationalities are represented.

As in all French lycées, students in the last two years ("première" and "terminale") can choose between an "L" section (literary), an "ES" section (economy and society) and an "S" section (scientific).

International students are also able to prepare for the OIB, and take classes in literature, history and geography in their second language.

The school constantly rates top in the region, i.e. in 2005, 97% of the graduating students received their baccalaureate, whereas the "2004-2005 success rate for the baccalauréat in mainland France was 79.7%" (see baccalauréat article).

The building is located on the Rhône riverside, and is a novelty in terms of architecture. After 15 years of hardship with the famous skyroof, a brand new one has been set in as of September 2007.

Programmes
The school includes the Section Japonaise (リヨン・ジェルラン補習授業校 Riyon Jeruran Hoshū Jugyō Kō  "Lyon Gerland Japanese Supplementary School"), which the Japanese Ministry of Education, Culture, Sports, Science and Technology (MEXT) counts as a part-time Japanese supplementary school.

Alumni
Rima Abdul Malak, minister of Culture of France

References

External links

Cité Scolaire Internationale de Lyon
CSI Anglophone Section
Official website (Archive)
Photos (Archive)

7th arrondissement of Lyon
Schools in Lyon
International schools in France
Lycées in Auvergne-Rhône-Alpes